Air Hawk or variation, may refer to:

Film
Airhawk, a 1981 Australian film based on the comic Air Hawk and the Flying Doctors
Air Hawks, a 1935 U.S. aviation science-fiction film 
The Air Hawk, a 1924 U.S. silent aviation adventure film

Fictional characters
 Jim "Air" Hawk, the titular fictional character from Air Hawk and the Flying Doctors 
 Jim "Airhawk" Hawk, the titular character from Airhawk
 Alfred Airhawk, a fictional character from the videogame franchise Fatal Fury

Other uses
Air Hawk and the Flying Doctors, Australian comic strip also known as "Air Hawk"

See also

 Hawkair, Canadian regional airline
 Hawk Air, British air taxi firm operating from Ipswich Airport
 
 
 Hawk (disambiguation)
 Air (disambiguation)